The Yadanabon is a military-owned newspaper published by the central region command based in Mandalay. The newspaper carries mainly Mandalay and Upper Myanmar-related news.

See also
List of newspapers in Burma
Media of Burma

References

Daily newspapers published in Myanmar
Mass media in Mandalay